Rostaq (also Romanized as Rostāq; also known as Rastagh, Rusāq, Rustākh, and Rūstāq) is a City in Rostaq Rural District, Rostaq District, Darab County, Fars Province, Iran. At the 2006 census, its population was 3,519, in 773 families.

References 

Populated places in Darab County